WNBY (1450 AM) is a radio station licensed to Newberry, Michigan broadcasting a classic country format. The station has been owned by Sovereign Communications since 2004, and shares a call-sign and ownership history with sister station WNBY-FM (Oldies 93), also based out of Newberry.

Launched by the Newberry Broadcasting Company in 1966 as the town's first radio station, WNBY-AM was broadcasting an adult contemporary & country format when both WNBY stations were purchased by Prime Time Productions in 1979. Under their ownership, WNBY-AM took on a middle of the road format in 1981, which WNBY-FM simulcasted until 1989. In 1982, Jack St. Andre purchased both stations, and they were inherited by his wife Peggy in 1993 after his passing, wherein she turned WNBY-AM into an easy listening station. F&W Broadcasting bought the stations from Peggy St. Andre in 1995, and after a 1997–2002 stint as a news/talk station, WNBY-AM adopted its current classic country format in 2002. Sovereign Communications purchased both WNBY stations in 2004.

WNBY-AM airs the popular local morning drive program Casey & The Coffee Crew and the call-in shopping program Trading Post on weekday mornings, as well as the seasonal hunting program Deer Hunters Round-Up, and live high school sports games featuring the Newberry Indians. On-air personalities include morning host and Newberry Indians play-by-play announcer Casey Cook, Trading Post host & DJ Travis Freeman, co-hosts Sarah Freeman & Jerry Carnes, Indians color commentator Josh Freed, and Sovereign Communications' chief meteorologist Karl Bohnak.

Sources 
Michiguide.com - WNBY (AM) History

External links

NBY-AM
Radio stations established in 1955
1955 establishments in Michigan